Klagenfurt Athletic Sports Club or EC KAC is a professional ice hockey team in the ICE Hockey League. The team plays their home games in Klagenfurt, Carinthia, Austria at Stadthalle Klagenfurt. EC KAC has won the most Austrian ice hockey Championships, a total of 32 times including 11 consecutive titles from 1964 to 1974, and four consecutive from 1985 to 1988. Most recently they won it in 2021.

History
The Klagenfurt Athletic Sports Club was founded on 18 September 1909 as an association. In 1919 the first attempts to establish an ice hockey team were trialled with an initial two-year apprenticeship from 1923 to 1925, before hockey was established as a full-fledged association in 1926.

In 1926, EC KAC joined the Austrian Ice Hockey Federation. At that time, there were no uniforms and the hockey players wore gym shorts, soccer socks, football jerseys, and skates known as Friesen, which used shoes made of wood with a metal bar as a runner, which were laced with leather straps on the feet. The puck was initially made from two soles of women's shoes nailed together. Much depended more on the ingenuity and dedication of the players and the preparation of the ice surface at the Kreuzberglteich.

In the 1933–34 season, EC KAC won its first league title and thus stopped the almost uninterrupted dominance of the Vienna Ice Skating Association. It marked the first time the title had not been awarded to a team from Vienna. The Second World War interrupted play abruptly and post-war it took a long time to get the league back functioning properly. However, many stars from the KAC's first league title success could again be counted to be the nucleus and further accelerated the rise of EC KAC well into the 1950s.

Between 1952 and 1960, KAC managed three further League titles, in a period in which Innsbruck EV were prominent in the Austrian Championship. With games still played outdoors and susceptible to inclement weather, on 22 November 1959, the Stadthalle Klagenfurt complex opened, which after several modifications is still in use today as the home rink of EC KAC.

At the turn of the 1960s, with the influx of influential players such as Dieter Kalt Snr and Sepp Puschnig, KAC sowed the seeds in dominating the Austrian championship from 1964 to 1980, in which the title went fifteen times to Klagenfurt. The team's only serious challenger in that time was ATSE Graz, which broke through with titles in 1975 and 1978.

During this time, EC KAC also partook in several European Cups. They first played in the 1965–66 season, and in the following 1966–67 season, the team reached the semi-finals and had to compete, as in the following season, against ZLK Brno. In 1969–70, EC KAC reached the final against HC CSKA Moscow, where they lost. Overall, EC KAC participated in the tournament nineteen times; only two fewer than the record held by CSKA Moscow.

Players

Current roster

Updated 4 February 2023.

|}

References

External links

 EC KAC Official Website

Ice hockey teams in Austria
Austrian Hockey League teams
Interliga (1999–2007) teams
Alpenliga teams
Ice hockey clubs established in 1909
1909 establishments in Austria
Sport in Klagenfurt